"Howl" is the debut single by American rock band Beware of Darkness. The song first appeared on the band's 2012 EP Howl and was featured on their debut studio Orthodox where it was an instant download with the pre-order of the album. The music video premiered on September 14, 2012 on Fuse.

Howl has been featured in the video game soundtracks of Saints Row IV, Need for Speed: Most Wanted, EA Sports UFC and Gran Turismo. The song has been featured in several television and movie projects including Stephen King's Under the Dome, Red 2, Monday Night Football and Nitro Circus 3D. On May 15, 2013 the band performed "Howl" live on Conan.

Chart performance

Personnel (EP Version)
Kyle Nicolaides – lead vocals, guitar
Daniel Curcio – bass guitar
Tony Cupito – drums
Claudio Cueni - engineer

Personnel (LP Version)
Kyle Nicolaides – lead vocals, guitar
Daniel Curcio – bass guitar
Tony Cupito – drums
Dave Sardy - executive producer
Greg Gordon - producer

References 

2013 singles
Song recordings produced by Dave Sardy
Beware of Darkness (band) songs
2013 songs